Thorpe Coombe Hospital was a psychiatric hospital and former maternity hospital in Walthamstow, London.

History
Walthamstow Borough Council acquired a mansion called North Bank which had been owned by Octavius Wigram for the purposes of establishing a maternity hospital in 1929. The hospital was opened by Dame Janet Campbell, a leading physician, in April 1934. As a maternity hospital it had circa 70 beds. It joined the National Health Service in 1948. It ceased maternity facilities in 1973 and was subsequently used as a nurses' home, then a treatment centre for Alzheimer's disease patients and latterly as a mental health facility.

The hospital closed in 2017, and parts of the site were demolished to make way for a new health centre, known as the Jane Atkinson Health and Wellbeing Centre, which opened in November 2019.

References

Defunct hospitals in London
Buildings and structures in the London Borough of Waltham Forest